The Latvian Olympic Committee ( or LOK) is a non-profit organization that is the National Olympic Committee for Latvia. Its headquarters are in Riga.

History 

The Committee was created on 23 April 1922. In 1923 it received a notice from International Olympic Committee that Latvia could take part in the next Olympic Games. After the occupation of Latvia by the Soviet Union in 1940, its activity was suspended. During this time, Latvians competed as part of USSR delegation.

The committee was reformed on 17 September 1988 and recognised by the IOC in 1991.

List of LOK Presidents

Member federations 
The Latvian National Federations are the organizations that coordinate all aspects of their individual sports. They are responsible for training, competition and development of their sports. There are currently 29 Olympic Summer and eight Winter Sport Federations and two another Sports Federations in Latvia.

Olympic Sport federations

Other federations

Latvian Olympiad
Beginning in 2004, the Latvian Olympic Committee has organised a multi-sport event called the Latvian Olympiad, usually shortly before the corresponding Olympic Games. Summer and Winter Latvian Olympiads and Youth Olympiads have been held. These are modelled on the Olympic Games, with teams representing Latvian municipalities, an opening and closing ceremony. In some cases, Olympiad competitions have served as qualifiers to the Latvian Olympic team.

See also 
Latvia at the Olympics
Latvian Paralympic Committee

References

External links 
Official website

National Olympic Committees
 
1922 establishments in Latvia
Olympic

Sports organizations established in 1922